A person of interest is an individual involved in a criminal investigation but not arrested or formally accused.

Person(s) of Interest or A Person of Interest may also refer to:

Television
 Person of Interest (Australian TV series), a documentary series featuring Gary Foley 
 Person of Interest (TV series), a 2011–2016 American science fiction crime drama series
 Person of Interest (soundtrack), a 2012 soundtrack album from the TV series
 "A Person of Interest" (Law & Order: Criminal Intent), an episode
 "A Person of Interest" (Medium), an episode
 "A Person of Interest" (Pretty Little Liars), an episode
 "Persons of Interest" (Lincoln Heights), an episode

Other media
 A Person of Interest (novel), a 2008 novel by Susan Choi
 A Person of Interest (album), a 2012 album by DJ Paul
 "Person of Interest" (song), a 2011 song by Rebecca Black